The Torneo de Promoción y Reserva is a football tournament in Peru. There are currently 17 clubs in the league. Each team will have a roster of twelve 21-year-old players, three 19-year-olds, and three older reinforcements; whenever they be recorded in the club. The tournament will offer the champion two bonus points and the runner-up one bonus point to the respective regular teams in the 2015 Torneo Descentralizado.

Teams

Stadia and locations

Torneo del Inca

Group A

Group B

Group C

Average table
The teams will be ranked based on points per game.

Torneo Apertura

Standings

Results

Torneo Clausura

Standings

Results

See also
2015 Torneo del Inca
2015 Torneo Descentralizado

References

External links 

  
Tournament regulations 
Tournament fixture 
Torneo de Promoción y Reserva  news at Peru.com 
Torneo de Promoción y Reserva news at Ovacion.pe 

Res
2015